Alternanthera flavicoma is a species of plant in the family Amaranthaceae. It is endemic to Ecuador.

References

Flora of Ecuador
flavicoma
Vulnerable plants
Taxonomy articles created by Polbot